Nasi tempong is an Indonesian rice dish, typical food of Osing people in Banyuwangi, consists of steamed rice with boiled vegetables (includes boiled spinach, cosmos and basil leaves), tofu, tempeh, corn fritter and fried ariid catfish. This rice dish served with kencur sambal or terasi sambal.

The "tempong" term is a word in Osing language which means "to be slapped" in English. Thus the nasi tempong named because the spicy taste of nasi tempong which giving a sensation like being slapped.

See also

Cuisine of Indonesia
Javanese cuisine
Nasi ambeng
Nasi bakar
Nasi campur
Nasi gandul
Nasi goreng
Nasi pecel

References

Javanese cuisine
Indonesian rice dishes